Jonathan Granström (born March 9, 1986 in Orsa) is a Swedish former professional ice hockey player. He last played with Brynäs IF in the Swedish Hockey League (SHL). After playing two season with Luleå HF, Granström returned to Brynäs IF on a three-year deal on April 18, 2016.

Awards and honors

References

External links

1986 births
Living people
Brynäs IF players
Luleå HF players
Mora IK players
Swedish ice hockey centres